Quasipaa yei, or Ye's spiny-vented frog, is a species of frog in the family Dicroglossidae. It is endemic to China where it is known from the Dabie Mountains that straddle the border between Hubei, Henan, and Anhui provinces. Its type locality is in Shengcheng County in Jiyuan City, Henan. Its natural habitats are temperate rivers with surrounding forests. It is potentially threatened by habitat loss.

The taxonomic position of this species has been in flux. Originally described as Paa (Feirana) yei in 2002, it has already been placed in genera Feirana (if raised from subgenus to genus), Yerana, and Nanorana, at least, before arriving at genus Quasipaa.

In medicine
The species is used in development of a drug called Rhodopsin.

References

External links

Quasipaa
Amphibians of China
Endemic fauna of China
Taxonomy articles created by Polbot
Amphibians described in 2002